O Desertor das Letras ("The Desertor of Letters") is a mock-heroic narrative poem by Colonial Brazilian author Silva Alvarenga, published in 1774.

1774 poems
Brazilian poems
Narrative poems
Mock-heroic poems
Satirical books